Bill Papas's mural of Portland, Oregon depicts more than 50 prominent residents of the city during the 1990s. The watercolor painting was displayed at a restaurant in the Hilton Portland Hotel from 1995 to 2014. It was donated to the Oregon Historical Society when the hotel and restaurant were redesigned. The Oregon Historical Society Museum exhibited the work in early 2015, and again for one month in 2018. People depicted in the mural include Stephen Bollenbach, Gert Boyle, James DePreist, Sho Dozono, Jack Faust, Peggy Fowler, Neil Goldschmidt, Mark Hatfield, Barron Hilton, Vera Katz, John Kitzhaber, Phil Knight, Robert B. Pamplin, Arlene Schnitzer, Fred Stickel, and Charles Swindells.

Description
The Oregonian Douglas Perry described the mural as "Portland's own version of the Sgt. Pepper's Lonely Hearts Club Band LP cover". People painted in the mural include:

 Shirley Berselli
 Mary Bishop
 Owen Blank
 Stephen Bollenbach
 Gwyneth Booth
 Gert Boyle
 James DePreist
 Sho Dozono
 Serge D'Rovencourt
 John Eskildsen
 Jack Faust
 Peggy Fowler
 Gerry Frank
 Stan Geffen
 Neil Goldschmidt
 Joseph Ha
 Antoinette Hatfield
 Mark Hatfield
 Barron Hilton
 Dieter Huckestein
 Jerry Hulsman
 Brad Hutton
 Roy Jay
 Vera Katz
 Ruth Keller
 John Kitzhaber
 Sharon LaCroix Kitzhaber
 Phil Knight
 Peter Kohler
 Bud Lindstrand
 Hillman Lueddemann Jr.
 Melvin "Pete" Mark Jr.
 Michael Maslowsky
 Carol McCall
 Diane McCall
 Larry Ogg
 Robert B. Pamplin
 Ron Ragen
 Dick Reiten
 Bob Ridgley
 Paul Romain
 Hilmar Rosenast
 Jim Rudd
 Arlene Schnitzer
 Ethel Simon-McWilliams
 Del Smith
 Fred Stickel
 Peter Stott
 Charles Swindells
 Ron Timpe
 Ben Whiteley
 Nancy Wilgenbusch
 Ted Winnowski
 Dick Woolworth

The Portlanders are gathered near the intersection of Southwest Broadway and Morrison Street, and several of the city's buildings are shown in the background, including the Broadway Building, Hilton Portland Hotel, Jackson Tower, Nordstrom, Pioneer Courthouse, and the Standard Insurance Center.

History
The mural was commissioned by Serge D'Rovencourt, a former manager of the Hilton Portland Hotel, and originally displayed in the hotel's restaurant, called Bistro 921, starting in 1995. In 2014, the hotel and bistro were remodeled and the painting was donated to the Oregon Historical Society. The work was displayed in the Oregon Historical Society Museum's North Wing Gallery in early 2015, for was showcased again for one month in 2018.

Reception
The Oregonian John Killen called the painting "fun" and "fanciful", and Douglas Perry said the mural was a "local favorite".

See also

 List of public art in Portland, Oregon
 Women Making History in Portland (2007), another mural depicting and honoring Portland women

Reception

External links
 

1990s in Portland, Oregon
1990s murals
Culture of Portland, Oregon
History of Portland, Oregon
Murals in Oregon
Paintings of people
Watercolor paintings